Hampton Village is a residential neighbourhood within the Confederation Suburban Development Area of Saskatoon, Saskatchewan. Hampton Village is the first suburb designed on Saskatoon's west side to be modelled after the village concept.  The residential area is constructed around the village centre consisting of shops, services and amenities for residential living, with walking trails radiating outward from the central core. This suburb has some detached homes and condominiums sold, and in 2008, there are still several areas still under construction.

The land on which Hampton Village sits was annexed over a period of many years. The western half (west of Junor Avenue) was annexed in July 1979, while the eastern half wasn't annexed until May 2000. Some remnant lots along the southern portion of the community rest on lands annexed by the city between 1911 and 1977.

Government and politics
Hampton Village exists within the federal electoral district of Saskatoon West. It is currently represented by Brad Redekopp of the Conservative Party of Canada, first elected in 2019.

Provincially, the area is within the constituency of Saskatoon Westview. It is currently represented by David Buckingham of the Saskatchewan Party, first elected in 2016.

In Saskatoon's non-partisan municipal politics, Hampton Village lies within ward 4. It is currently represented by Troy Davies, first elected in 2012.

Institutions

Education

As of September 2017, two elementary schools exist in Hampton Village. On October 22, 2013, the provincial government announced funding for four new P3 facilities in Saskatoon, including a joint-use public/separate school facility in Hampton Village. Greater Saskatoon Catholic Schools revealed in June 2015 that the division's new elementary school in Hampton Village would be named after Lorenzo Ruiz, while Saskatoon Public Schools announced in October 2016 that its new elementary school would be named after Ernest Lindner. Both schools were completed ahead of the 2017-2018 school year.

Hampton Village Community Garage Sale
The Hampton Village Community Association hosts an annual Community-wide Garage Sale and Fundraising BBQ.

References 
Bill Barry, Geographic Names of Saskatchewan (Regina: People Places Publishing, 2005)

Notes

External links

City of Saskatoon City of Saskatoon · Departments · Community Services · City Planning · ZAM Maps
Populace Spring 2006
City of Saskatoon - Local Area Plans
Developer Web Site

Neighbourhoods in Saskatoon